Thoreauea is a genus of flowering plants belonging to the family Apocynaceae.

It is native to southern Mexico.

The genus name of Thoreauea is in honour of Henry David Thoreau (1817–1862), an American naturalist, essayist, poet and philosopher. 
It was first described and published in Lundellia Vol.5 on page 47 in 2002.

Known species
According to Royal Botanic Gardens, Kew:
Thoreauea aberrans 
Thoreauea guerrerensis 
Thoreauea paneroi

References

Apocynaceae
Apocynaceae genera
Plants described in 2002
Flora of Mexico